Telecommunications in Kuwait provides information about the telephone, Internet, radio, and television infrastructure in Kuwait.

Infrastructure

Telephones
Telephones - main lines in use:
514,700 (2011), 510,300 (2005)

Telephones - mobile cellular:
4.9 million (2011), 2.7 million (2007)

Telephone system:
general assessment: the quality of service is excellent
domestic: new telephone exchanges provide a large capacity for new subscribers; trunk traffic is carried by microwave radio relay, coaxial cable, open-wire and fiber-optic cable; a cellular telephone system operates throughout Kuwait, and the country is well supplied with pay telephones. 
international: linked to international submarine cable Fiber-Optic Link Around the Globe (FLAG); linked to Bahrain, Qatar, UAE via the Fiber-Optic Gulf (FOG) cable; coaxial cable and microwave radio relay to Saudi Arabia; satellite earth stations - 6 (3 Intelsat - 1 Atlantic Ocean and 2 Indian Ocean, 1 Inmarsat - Atlantic Ocean, and 2 Arabsat) 
country code: 965

Broadcast media
Radio broadcast stations:
AM 6, FM 11, shortwave 1 (1998)

Radios:
1.175 million (1997)

Television broadcast stations:
13 (plus several satellite channels) (1997)

Televisions:
875,000 (1997)

Internet
Internet Service Providers (ISPs):
5 (2011)
Which are: Fasttelco, Gulfnet, KEMS, Mada, and Qualitynet

Internet users:
1,925,956 or 74.2% of the population (2011), 700,000 (2005)

Top-level domain: .kw

See also
 Telephone numbers in Kuwait
 Television in Kuwait
 Wataniya Telecom

References

External links
  Nokia to upgrade Kuwaiti network, BBC News, 29 May 2005

 
Kuwait